Nicholas N. Poppe (Nikoláj/Níkolas Nikolájevič Poppe; 27 July 1897 – 8 August 1991) was an important Russian linguist. He is also known as Nikolaus Poppe, with his first name in its German form. He is often cited as N.N. Poppe in academic publications.

Poppe was a leading specialist in the Mongolic languages and the hypothetical (and controversial) Altaic language family to which the Mongolic, Turkic, and Tungusic languages belong. Poppe was open-minded toward the inclusion of Korean in Altaic, but regarded the evidence for the inclusion of Korean as weaker than that for the inclusion of Mongolic, Turkic, and Tungusic.

Life
Nicholas Poppe's father was stationed in China as a consular officer in the Russian diplomatic service. Poppe was born in Yantai, Shandong, China, on 27 July 1897.

Poppe's boyhood and youth were marked by wars: the Boxer Rebellion, the Russo-Japanese War, the First World War, and the Russian Civil War, which was followed by the establishment of the Soviet regime. Later, he experienced Stalin's Great Purge and the Second World War.

Poppe graduated from the Mongolian Department of the Faculty of Social Sciences of Petrograd University in 1921 where his main mentor B. Ya. Vladimirtsov. He began teaching at the Institute for Modern Oriental Languages before he had completed his studies in 1920 at the age of 23. Three years later, in 1923, he began teaching at the University of Leningrad. In 1931, he was appointed head of the Department of Mongolian Studies in the Institute of Oriental Studies at the Soviet Academy of Sciences. In 1933, at the age of 36, he was elected as the youngest associate member of the Soviet Academy of Sciences.

During World War II Poppe lived in the Caucasus, in a region which was overtaken by the Germans. Poppe served as a translator between the local population and the German invaders. When the Germans withdrew he and his family also took the opportunity to leave the Soviet Union. In 1943 Poppe moved with his family to Berlin. After the war, he spent several years underground in hiding from the Soviets. In 1949, he managed to emigrate to the United States, where he joined the faculty of the Far East and Russian Institute at the University of Washington. He continued teaching there up to his retirement in 1968.

In 1968, he was awarded an honorary doctorate by the University of Bonn. He was elected a Foreign Member of the Finnish Academy of Sciences in 1968 and again in 1977.

In May 1989, a group of graduate students interested in Central and Inner Asian Studies initiated the first Nicholas Poppe Symposium. Poppe attended its first meeting in 1989 and the second in 1990. He was invited to the third meeting in May 1991 but was unable to attend on account of the state of his health.

Poppe died on 8 August 1991 in Seattle at the age of 94.

Academic career
Poppe spoke fluent Mongolian and attained an unmatched familiarity with Mongolian oral literature. His research focused on studies of the Altaic language family, especially Khalkha-Mongolian and Buryat-Mongolian, and on studies of the folklore of these and related languages. He wrote manuals and grammars of written and colloquial Khalkha-Mongolian and Buriat-Mongolian, Yakut, the Alar dialect, and Bashkir.

His publications in the realm of Mongolian oral literature include eleven volumes of Mongolian epics, collections of Mongolian sayings, songs, and fairy tales, and Mongolian versions of works in Sanskrit.

After 1949, Poppe wrote mostly in German and English, in addition to Russian. Regardless of the language he used, his writing was remarkable for its simplicity and clarity. As a result, his works are easily comprehensible to specialists and non-specialists alike.

Works
Poppe was a highly prolific scholar. A bibliography of his publications from 1924 to 1987 includes 284 books and articles and 205 book reviews. Between 1949 and 1968 — a period during which he was teaching 16 to 17 hours a week at the University of Washington, with only three months in the summer for uninterrupted research — he wrote 217 works, including over 40 books.

The secret of his high productivity, as he jokingly described it, was that while other people were enjoying "the beautiful surroundings of Seattle, climbing the mountains or sailing the waters", "he sits at his desk, wearing out one typewriter after the other like other people wear out their shoes".

Publications

Books authored

1926
Yakut Grammar for students.
1927
The Chuvash and their neighbours.
Materials for the investigation of the Tungus language: the dialect of the Barguzin Tungus.
The Finno-Ugric peoples: a sketch.
1930
The Alar dialect. Part I, Phonetics and morphology
1931
The Alar dialect. Part II, Texts
Practical manual of colloquial Mongolian (Khalkha dialect)
Materials on the Solon Language
1932
Manual of Mongolian
Specimens of Khalkha-Mongolian folklore: North Khalkha dialect
Notes on the dialect of the Aga Buriat
1933
Buriat-Mongolian linguistics
Linguistic problems of East Siberia
1934
The language and collective farm poetry of the Buriat-Mongols of the Selenga region
1935
Annals of the Barguzin Buriats: texts and investigation
Annals of the Khori-Buriate. First issue: The chronicles of Tugultur Toboev and Vandan Yumsunov
1936
Annals of the Selenga Buriats. First issue: Chronicle of Ubashi Dambi Jaltsan Lombo
Tserenov of 1868
Khalkha-Mongolian structure
Buriat-Mongolian folkloristic and dialectological collection
1937
Khalkha-Mongolian heroic epics
Grammar of written Mongolian
Grammar of the Buriat-Mongolian language
1940
Annals of the Khori-Buriats. First issue: Chronicles of Tugultur Toboev and Vandan Yumsunov
Manual of Mongolian
1941
History of the Mongolian Script. Vol.1: The square script
1951
Khalkha-Mongolian grammar: with bibliography, texts, and glossary.
1954
Grammar of written Mongolian.
1955
Introduction to Mongolian comparative studies.
Mongolian folklore: sayings, songs, fairytales and heroic sagas.
1957
The Mongolian monuments in the 'Phagspa script
1960
Comparative grammar of the Altaic languages. Part I: Comparative phonology.
Buryat Grammar
1964
Bashkir manual
1965
Introduction to Altaic linguistics
1967
The twelve deeds of the Buddha: a Mongolian version of the Lalitavistara

Mongolian texts with English translation and notes 

1970
Mongolian language handbook
1971
The Diamond Sutra: three Mongolian versions of the Vajracchedikaaprajnaapaaramitaa: texts, translations, notes, and glossaries
Khalkha-Mongolian heroic epic
1972
The language and collective farm poetry of the Buriat-Mongols of the Selenga region
1975
Mongolian epics I
Mongolian epics II
Mongolian epics III
Mongolian epics IV
1976
Mongolian epics V
1977
Mongolian epics VI
1978
Tsongol folklore (the language and Collective Farm poetry of the Buriat-Mongols of the Selenga Region) Tsongol folklore : transl. of the collection, the language and collective farm poetry of the Buriat Mongols of the Selenga region / by Nicholas Poppe.    
1980
Mongolian epics IX
1985
Mongolian epics XI

See also
 List of Eastern Bloc defectors

References 

Poppe, N.N., Walther Heissig, and Klaus Sagaster. 1989: Gedanke Und Wirkung : Festschrift zum 90. Geburtstag von Nikolaus Poppe. Asiatische Forschungen Bd. 108. Wiesbaden: Otto Harrassowitz. ISSN 0571-320X.
Cirtautas, Arista Maria. "Nicholas Poppe: A bibliography of publications from 1924-1977." Parerga 4. Seattle: Institute for Comparative and Foreign Area Studies, University of Washington, 1977.
 Алпатов В. М. Лингвистическое наследие Н. Поппе // ВЯ. 1992, №3. С.119-125.
 Алпатов В. М. Николай-Николас Поппе // Бюллетень Общества монголоведов РАН. 1993.
 Алпатов В. М. Советское востоковедение в оценках Н. Поппе // Mongolica, III. Санкт-Петербург. Фарн. 1994. С.38-46.
 Алпатов В. М. Николай-Николас Поппе. М. Восточная литература. 1996. 144 с.
 Алпатов В. М. Переписка Н.Н. Поппе с советскими востоковедами// Известия РАН, серия литературы и языка. 2000, №5. С.52-57.

External links 
 several dozens of Poppe works available on-line
 Nicholas Poppe Symposium at the University of Washington Includes biographical material and photos.

1897 births
1991 deaths
Writers from Yantai
Mongolists
'Phags-pa script scholars
Russian orientalists
Linguists from the Soviet Union
20th-century linguists
Paleolinguists
Linguists of Altaic languages
Saint Petersburg State University alumni
Corresponding Members of the USSR Academy of Sciences
Soviet defectors to the United States